Short Interframe Space (SIFS), is the amount of time in microseconds required for a wireless interface to process a received frame and to respond with a response frame. It is the difference in time between the first symbol of the response frame in the air and the last symbol of the received frame in the air. A SIFS time consists of the delay in receiver RF, PLCP delay and the MAC processing delay, which depends on the physical layer used. In IEEE 802.11 networks, SIFS is the interframe spacing prior to transmission of an acknowledgment, a Clear To Send (CTS)  frame, a block ack frame that is an immediate response to either a block ack request frame or an A-MPDU, the second or subsequent MPDU of a fragment burst, a station responding to any polling a by point coordination function and during contention free periods of point coordination function.

Implications for Software Radio 

Because most Software-Defined Radios use a host computer for processing, the SIFS imposes a difficult to achieve time constraint, as the latency for most SDR systems for the signal to traverse from the radio to the host and back to the radio, and vice versa, exceeds the SIFS requirements.

While in some cases it is possible to achieve SIFS requirements for testing, the practical approach is almost always to leverage the FPGA portion of processors common to many commercial SDRs.

See also 
 DIFS – DCF Interframe Space
 RIFS – Reduced Interframe Space
 PCF – Point coordination function
 PIFS – PCF Interframe Space
 EIFS – Extended interframe space

References 

IEEE 802.11